Pseudofulvimonas  is a Gram-negative and rod-shaped genus of Pseudomonadota  with one known species (Pseudofulvimonas gallinarii). Pseudofulvimonas gallinarii has been isolated from air from a duck barn.

References

Xanthomonadales
Bacteria genera
Monotypic bacteria genera